Miljevina is a village in the municipality of Foča, Republika Srpska, an entity of Bosnia and Herzegovina.

Demographics

Footnotes

References

Books 

 
 
 
 
 

Villages in Republika Srpska
Populated places in Foča